Anjelica Huston is an American actress, author, director and producer who has received numerous accolades throughout her career.

Huston had her breakthrough role in the black comedy film Prizzi's Honor (1985), which won her the Academy Award for Best Supporting Actress, making her the third generation of her family to win an Oscar, following her father John and grandfather Walter Huston. For Prizzi's Honor, she was also nominated for a British Academy Film Award (BAFTA) and a Golden Globe Award. She received two additional Academy Award nominations for Enemies, A Love Story (1989) and The Grifters (1990), in the Best Supporting Actress and Best Actress categories, respectively. For her performances in the Woody Allen-directed films Crimes and Misdemeanors (1989) and Manhattan Murder Mystery (1993), she received two BAFTA Award for Best Actress in a Supporting Role nominations. She also received acclaim for her portrayal of the Grand High Witch in Roald Dahl's film adaptation The Witches (1990), earning a Saturn Award for Best Actress nomination, and for her interpretation of Morticia Addams in The Addams Family (1991) and its sequel Addams Family Values (1993), receiving two nominations for the Golden Globe Award for Best Actress in a Motion Picture – Comedy or Musical.

Huston made her directorial debut with the film Bastard Out of Carolina (1996), for which she earned nominations for a Directors Guild of America Award for Outstanding Directorial Achievement in Dramatic Specials and a Primetime Emmy Award for Outstanding Directing for a Limited Series or Movie. Her other television performances include the miniseries Iron Jawed Angels (2004), that won her the Golden Globe Award for Best Supporting Actress in a Series, Miniseries or Television Film, and Lonesome Dove (1989), The Mists of Avalon (2001), and Medium (2008–2009), for all of which she was nominated at the Primetime Emmy Awards.

Awards and nominations

Notes

References

External links 
  

Huston, Anjelica
Huston, Anjelica